Bombella  is a genus of bacteria from the family of Acetobacteraceae.

References

Further reading 
 
 

Rhodospirillales
Bacteria genera